Biltmore–Oteen Bank Building is a historic bank building located at Biltmore Village, Asheville, Buncombe County, North Carolina.  It was built between 1925 and 1930, and is a two-story, brick building with Colonial Revival / Georgian Revival design details.  It is a thin, wedge-shaped building featuring concrete detail and Doric order type pilasters.

It was listed on the National Register of Historic Places in 1979.

References

External links

Bank buildings on the National Register of Historic Places in North Carolina
Colonial Revival architecture in North Carolina
Georgian Revival architecture in North Carolina
Commercial buildings completed in 1925
Buildings and structures in Asheville, North Carolina
National Register of Historic Places in Buncombe County, North Carolina